Yaser Muzmel Muhamed Al-Tayeb (born 1 January 1992) is a Sudanese professional footballer who plays as a midfielder for Al-Hilal Omdurman and the Sudan national football team.

References 

Living people
1993 births
Sudanese footballers
Sudan international footballers
Al-Hilal Club (Omdurman) players
Association football wingers
2022 African Nations Championship players
Sudan A' international footballers